Basin may refer to:

Geography and geology
 Depression (geology)
 Back-arc basin, a submarine feature associated with island arcs and subduction zones
 Debris basin, designed to prevent damage from debris flow
 Drainage basin (hydrology), a topographic region in which all water drains to a common area
 Endorheic basin, a closed topographic low area with no drainage outlet 
 Impact basin, a large impact crater
 Retention basin, stormwater runoff to prevent flooding and downstream erosion which includes a permanent pool of water
 Detention basin, a man-made basin used to temporarily store surplus water from rivers.
 Sedimentary basin (sedimentology), a low and usually sinking region that is filled with sediments from adjacent higher areas
 Structural basin, rock strata formed by tectonic warping of previously flat-lying strata
 Oceanic basin, a structural basin covered by seawater
 Pull-apart basin, a section of crust separated by the action of two strike-slip faults
 Tidal basin, an area that fills with water at high tide
 Tropical cyclone basins, oceans or areas of oceans used for classifying tropical cyclones

Objects
 Bowl, a round container
 Pudding basin, a bowl in which raw pudding dough or batter is placed for cooking
 Emesis basin, a kidney-shaped bowl used in hospitals etc. for vomit
 Sink, a plumbing fixture
 Toilet basin, an alternate name for the bowl (pan) of a flush toilet
 Wash basin, a sink or bowl to contain water for cleaning hands and other minor washing
 Basin stand or washstand, an obsolete piece of furniture to hold a wash basin, jug, towel, etc.

Place names

Oceania
 Basin Reserve, New Zealand, a cricket ground in Wellington
 The Basin (Rottnest Island), Western Australia
 The Basin, New South Wales, Australia, a locality in northern Sydney
 The Basin, Victoria, Australia, a suburb in Melbourne

United States
 Basin, Alabama
 Basin, California, an unincorporated community now named Huntington Lake, California
 Basin, Mississippi
 Basin, Montana
 Basin, Wyoming, seat of Big Horn County
 Basin Mountain (New York), a summit of the Adirondack Park
 Basin Street, New Orleans, Louisiana
 Mill Basin, Brooklyn, in New York
 The Basin, a river pothole in Franconia Notch State Park

Elsewhere
 Basin (Martian crater)
 Basin, Masovian Voivodeship, Poland
 Amazon Basin (sedimentary basin)

Other uses
 "Basin" (chanson de geste), a poem about Charlemagne's childhood
 Basin, the area of a dry dock which can be flooded and drained
 Basin of attraction, in mathematics, an area of a nonlinear system with an attractor
 Canal basin, a docking section of canal wide enough to allow for uninterrupted canal traffic
 Basin (horse), American Thoroughbred racehorse
 Thomas Basin (1412–1491), French bishop of Lisieux and historian

See also
 
 Basan (disambiguation)
 Basen (disambiguation)
 Bassin (disambiguation)